Persea palustris, also known as swamp bay or swampbay, is a small tree or shrub found throughout the Southeastern United States and the Bahamas, with much of its range overlapping with that of its relative Persea borbonia. Mature leaves are green, paler on their undersides, which have prominent brownish or reddish-brown hairs. The species prefers swamps and costal areas, particularly locations with moist, peat-rich soil. It is sensitive to the fungal disease known as laurel wilt, even more so than related species.

Description

The trunk is usually under  in diameter. The branches are stout, and when young, they are terete (have circular cross-sections) and slightly angled. During the tree's first two seasons, it is covered with a layer of rust-colored tomentum, which is significantly reduced after that time and completely gone in two or three years. The leaves can be lanceolate or long-elliptic, medium to dark green on their uppersides, with paler undersides, which are covered in distinctive brownish hairs. The flowers are small and bisexual (having both male and female components), with 6 tepals (outer parts), 9 stamens (pollen-producing organs), and one pistil (which contains female reproductive parts). They are yellow-green, with 2–3 petals, and appear in May and June. The dense, reddish brown hairy coating on the leaves and branches readily distinguishes it from its relatives Persea humilis and Persea borbonia.

Taxonomy
Persea palustris was initially described as Laurus carolinensis by François André Michaux in 1813, and then reassigned to Laurus carolinensis var. pubescens by Frederick Traugott Pursh. Constantine Samuel Rafinesque later described it as Tamala palustris in 1838. Charles Sprague Sargent later used the name Persea pubescens in 1895. In 1919, he revised its name to Persea palustris, due to the naming rules adopted by the International Botanical Congress, which stated that the first specific name must be used. Of these names, the Integrated Taxonomic Information System recognizes only Persea pubescens as a synonym for Persea palustris, as well as Persea borbonia var. pubescens (given by Elbert Luther Little) and Tamala pubescens (given by John Kunkel Small). It is also referred to as swamp bay and swampbay.

Distribution and habitat
Persea palustris is distributed throughout the Southeastern United States and the Bahamas, found in eleven different US states, from Delaware to Southeast Texas. Its range heavily overlaps with that of the Persea borbonia. It is common throughout Florida, including the Florida Keys. It is also common in costal plain regions of North Carolina. Its natural habitat includes swamps, bays, pocosins, costal swales, and maritime forests, particularly in wet, peaty soil, although it can also grow in dry, sandy soil.

Conservation
Laurel wilt is a significant danger to Persea palustris. It is caused by the fungus Raffaelea lauricola, which is spread by the redbay ambrosia beetle, a nonnative species introduced to the United States (other species of ambrosia beetle can also carry it, but at lower levels). While laurel wilt affects other members of Lauraceae, swamp bay is particularly sensitive. It is more resistant to galls (swelling growths) than Persea borbonia.

References

palustris
Trees of the Bahamas
Trees of the Southeastern United States